Li Yajuan (Chinese: 李亚娟; born 23 July 1971 in Shuangliao, Jilin) is a Chinese weightlifter who was active in the late 1980s and early 1990s, winning four World Championships in a row.

References

 Gottfried Schödl: World Championships Seniors 1997-2007 and Statistics , p. 95

Living people
1971 births
Chinese female weightlifters
World Weightlifting Championships medalists
Asian Games gold medalists for China
Weightlifters at the 1994 Asian Games
Asian Games medalists in weightlifting
People from Siping
Weightlifters from Jilin

Medalists at the 1994 Asian Games
20th-century Chinese women